Konrad Czerniak (born 11 July 1989) is a Polish competitive swimmer who has participated in the Olympics, FINA world championships, and European championships. He won ten medals at these championships, mostly in the butterfly.

At the 2012 Summer Olympics, he competed in the men's 100 m butterfly and the men's 100 m freestyle, reaching the final of the butterfly and the semifinals of the freestyle.

At the 2016 Summer Olympics, he competed in the men's 100 m butterfly, reaching the semifinals, and the men's  medley and  freestyle.

References

External links

London 2012 Profile

1989 births
Living people
Polish male butterfly swimmers
Olympic swimmers of Poland
Swimmers at the 2012 Summer Olympics
Swimmers at the 2016 Summer Olympics
People from Puławy
World Aquatics Championships medalists in swimming
European Aquatics Championships medalists in swimming
Sportspeople from Lublin Voivodeship
Polish male freestyle swimmers
Swimmers at the 2020 Summer Olympics
21st-century Polish people